Rewind is a 2019 American documentary film directed by Sasha Neulinger. The film documents a family's struggle to understand and come to terms with multiple cases of child abuse, culminating in three criminal prosecutions. The film makes extensive use of the family's camcorder footage recorded before, during, and after the period in which the abuse occurred.

The film includes coverage of the high-profile prosecution of Howard Nevison, a former cantor at the Jewish congregation of Temple Emanu-El in New York.

The film was part-funded via crowdfunding website Kickstarter. The funding campaign commenced on 30 March 2014, and was marketed as "Rewind To Fast-Forward" and raised just over US$175,000.

Accolades
 Tribeca Film Festival – Special Jury Mention
 Atlanta Jewish Film Festival – Documentary Jury Prize

References

External links
 
 

2019 films
2019 documentary films
American documentary films
Documentary films about pedophilia
2010s English-language films
2010s American films